Hudson River crash could refer to:

US Airways Flight 1549 - ditching of a flock-stroken Airbus in the river in 2009
2009 Hudson River mid-air collision of a small plane with a helicopter

Hudson River